Mark Pieth (born 9 March 1953) is Professor of Criminal Law at the University of Basel, Switzerland and a prominent anti-corruption expert.

Pieth's career as a legal expert, defence lawyer, judge and compliance advisor includes several roles on the international stage, such as a member of the Financial Action Task Force on Money Laundering, Chair of a United Nations Intergovernmental Expert Group on illicit drug trafficking and 24 years as Chair of the OECD Working Group on Bribery, which monitors the OECD Anti-Bribery Convention.

He is known for spearheading initiatives to combat corruption and money laundering in all its forms through regulations, country monitoring, compliance, advocacy and arbitration. In the field of commodities, he was appointed by the UN Secretary General Kofi Annan to the Independent Inquiry Committee into the Iraq Oil-for-Food Programme.

He is President of the Basel Institute on Governance, a research and policy institute he founded to help combat public and private sector abuses of power.

Publications
Over the last 17 years, Mark Pieth has authored or edited 34 books in the fields of economic and organised crime, corruption, money laundering and criminal law. The ones in English  include:

 Pieth, Mark, Lucinda A. Low, and Nicola Bonucci. The OECD Convention on Bribery: A Commentary : a Commentary on the Convention on Combating Bribery of Foreign Public Officials in International Business Transactions of 21 November 1997. Cambridge: Cambridge University Press, 2014.
 Pieth, Mark. Financing Terrorism. Dordrecht: Springer, 2011.
 Pieth, Mark,(editor)  and Eva Joly. Recovering stolen assets. Bern ]: Peter Lang, 2008.
 Pieth, Mark, and Gemma Aiolfi. A Comparative Guide to Anti-Money Laundering: A Critical Analysis of Systems in Singapore, Switzerland, the UK and the USA. Cheltenham: Elgar, 2004.

Recent publications aimed the general public include:

References

External links
 Personal website and CV

Living people

21st-century Swiss judges

Academic staff of the University of Basel

1953 births
20th-century Swiss lawyers
Swiss officials of the United Nations